Rockoon is the forty-fourth major release and twenty-first studio album released by Tangerine Dream. The album was started in March 1991 and completed January 1992, making it the longest production ever in the band's history until the release of Quantum Gate in 2017. The album was nominated in the US for the "Best New Age Album 1992" Grammy and reached the Top Ten in Billboard New Age charts and the Top Twenty in Billboard Jazz charts.

It is the first full album of Tangerine Dream music as a father and son duo. Saxophone player Linda Spa who joined in 1990 does not appear on this release.

The album was re-released in 1999 on Tangerine Dream's own TDI label with new cover artwork by Edgar Froese.

Track listing

Personnel
Tangerine Dream
 Edgar Froese - composer, musician
 Jerome Froese - composer, musician
Future Tangerine Dream
 Zlatko Perica - musician
Additional musicians: 
 Enrico Fernandez - musician
 Richi Wester - musician
Technical: 
 David Marino - recording engineer
 Phillip Calvert - recording engineer
 Jeff Robinson - recording engineer

Rockoon Special Edition
Rockoon was accompanied by a special limited single edition CD-5. It included an edited version of the title track, the bonus track "Oriental Haze" featuring Linda Spa and an interview with Edgar Froese.

Big City Dwarves
"Big City Dwarves" was used as a promo single with a release of 200 to 300 copies.

References

1992 albums
Tangerine Dream albums